Conquerall Bank is a community in the Canadian province of Nova Scotia, located in the Municipality of the District of Lunenburg in Lunenburg County.  The community was involved with the Chesapeake Affair during the American Civil War.

In 1967 the citizens of the community incorporated a volunteer fire department as their centennial project.

Since October 2000, the municipal representation is by councillor Martin Bell.

References

Conquerall Bank on Destination Nova Scotia

Communities in Lunenburg County, Nova Scotia
General Service Areas in Nova Scotia